Grant Taylor (born 26 July 1950) is a New Zealand sports shooter. He competed in the men's 50 metre running target event at the 1976 Summer Olympics.

References

External links
 

1950 births
Living people
New Zealand male sport shooters
Olympic shooters of New Zealand
Shooters at the 1976 Summer Olympics
People from Levin, New Zealand